Nancy A. Hewitt (born 1951) is a Professor Emeritus at Rutgers University, winner of the Guggenheim Fellowship, and a leading expert on gender history and feminism.

Career 
After a Bachelors' degree at the State University of New York, Brockport, she obtained her PhD from the University of Pennsylvania. From 1996 to 1997, she was a fellow at the Center for Advanced Studies in Stanford. Professor Hewitt was Pitt Professor of American History and Institutions at the University of Cambridge in 2009-2010. She also taught at the University of South Florida and Duke University.

Research 
Hewitt's research focuses on American women's history, nineteenth century U.S. history, women's activism and feminism in comparative perspective. She has published and edited several books. Her work has been cited in the press including in Slate, The Conversation and there is an interview of her on History Matters.

Selected bibliography

References

External links
 Nancy Hewitt research collection, Rare Books, Special Collections, and Preservation, River Campus Libraries, University of Rochester

Living people
1951 births
Rutgers University faculty
Place of birth missing (living people)
State University of New York at Brockport alumni
University of Pennsylvania alumni
Women's historians
American women historians
21st-century American historians
Historians of the United States
21st-century American women